Local elections were held in Parañaque City on May 13, 2013 within the Philippine general election. The voters elected for the elective local posts in the city: the mayor, vice mayor, the congressman, and the councilors, eight of them in the two districts of the city.

Background 
Mayor Florencio M. Bernabe Jr. was term-limited. His son, Second District Councilor Florencio "Benjo" Bernabe III ran for his place. Bernabe was challenged by First District Representative Edwin Olivarez.

Vice Mayor Gustavo Tambunting was on his second term. He won't ran for third and final term, instead, he ran as representative of Second District. Second District Councilor Jose Enrico Golez, son of Representative Roilo Golez ran for his place. Golez was challenged by his fellow councilor, Edwin Benzon of the same district.

First District Representative Edwin Olivarez was on his first term. He won't ran for second term, instead he ran as Mayor. His brother, Councilor Eric Olivarez ran for his place. Olivarez was challenged by former Representative Eduardo Zialcita and former Councilor Florante "Jun" Romey Jr.

Second District Representative Roilo Golez was term-limited. Vice Mayor Gustavo Tambunting ran for his place. Tambunting was challenged by former Mayor and actor Joselito "Joey" Marquez and Pacifico Rosal.

Results 
Names written in bold-Italic are the re-elected incumbents while in italic are incumbents lost in elections.

For Mayor 
First District Representative Edwin Olivarez defeated Second District Councilor Florencio "Benjo" Bernabe.

Vice Mayor 
Second District Councilor Jose Enrico Golez defeated his fellow councilor, Edwin Benzon of the same district.

For Representative

First District 
Councilor Eric Olivarez defeated Former Representative Eduardo Zialcita and Former Councilor Florante "Jun" Romey Jr.

Second District 
Vice Mayor Gustavo Tambunting defeated former Mayor and actor Joselito "Joey" Marquez and Pacifico Rosal.

For Councilors

First District 

|-bgcolor=black
|colspan=5|

Second District 

|-bgcolor=black
|colspan=5|

References

Parañaque
2013 Local
2013 elections in Metro Manila